Hastula marqueti is a species of sea snail, a marine gastropod mollusc in the family Terebridae, the auger snails.

Description
The length of the shell varies between 10 mm and 18 mm.

Distribution
This marine species occurs in the Indian Ocean off Kenya.

References

 Aubry U. (1994). Description of a new species of the genus Terebra (Gastropoda). World Shells. 9: 25-27

External links
 Fedosov, A. E.; Malcolm, G.; Terryn, Y.; Gorson, J.; Modica, M. V.; Holford, M.; Puillandre, N. (2020). Phylogenetic classification of the family Terebridae (Neogastropoda: Conoidea). Journal of Molluscan Studies. 85(4): 359-388
 Gastropods.com: Hastula marqueti

Terebridae
Gastropods described in 1994